The Little Sisters of the Abandoned Elderly  (Spanish: Hermanitas de los Ancianos Desamparados; Latin: Congregatio Parvarum Sororum Senium Derelictorum; abbreviation: H.A.D.) is a religious institute of pontifical right whose members profess public vows of chastity, poverty, and obedience and follow the evangelical way of life in common.

Members dedicated themselves to the care of the elderly.

This religious institute was founded in Barbastro, Spain, in 1872, by Saint Teresa of Jesus, and her collaborator Saturnino López Novoa.

The sisters have houses in Africa, Europe and Latin America. The Generalate of the Congregation can be found in Valencia, Spain.

On 31 December 2005 there are 2527 sisters in 210 communities.

External links
 Little Sisters of the Abandoned Elderly official site

Catholic female orders and societies
Religious organizations established in 1872
Catholic religious institutes established in the 19th century
1872 establishments in Spain